The Saints Peter and Paul Catholic Church Complex in Bow Valley, Nebraska was listed on the National Register of Historic Places in 2000.  The church, built in 1903, is massive relative to the small size of the Bow Valley community.

The complex includes a rectory built in 1926, a school, and a Grotto of Our Lady of Fatima which was completed in 1952.  There are in total five contributing buildings, plus a contributing site and a contributing object.

References

Churches on the National Register of Historic Places in Nebraska
Colonial Revival architecture in Nebraska
Gothic Revival architecture in Nebraska
Churches completed in 1904
Buildings and structures in Cedar County, Nebraska